Waldingfield may refer to:
Great Waldingfield, Suffolk, England
Little Waldingfield, Suffolk, England